Paul Little may refer to:

Paul Little (businessman) (born 1947), former managing director of Toll Holdings
Paul Little (author) (1915–1987), pulp fiction writer

Paul Little (rugby union) (1934–1993), New Zealand rugby union player
Max Hardcore (Paul F. Little, born 1956), pornographic actor